Oudezeele (from Flemish; Oudezele in modern Dutch spelling) is a commune in the Nord department in northern France. It is around 45 km north-west of Lille. The population is 681 (as of 2018).

Heraldry

See also
Communes of the Nord department

References

Communes of Nord (French department)
French Flanders